John B. Brunow (born October 14, 1949) is a former American politician from the state of Iowa.

Brunow was born in Centerville, Iowa in 1949. He graduated from Centerville Community High School in 1967 and attended the University of Iowa from 1967 through 1971.

References

1949 births
Living people
Iowa Democrats